Anthony Rowe (after 1641 – 9 September 1704) was an English Whig politician who sat in the House of Commons of England for several periods between 1689 and 1701.

Biography
Rowe was the son of Sir Thomas Rowe of Muswell Hill and Anne Langton. He was a descendant of William Rowe and was a cousin of Thomas Roe.

In the 1670s, Rowe became an associate of James Scott, 1st Duke of Monmouth and served as his adjutant during the Flanders campaign of 1678. In 1679 he was granted lease of a hearth tax tax farm for five years. He remained aligned to Monmouth and in 1683 he was publicly denied any association with the Rye House Plot. Rowe was briefly arrested during the Monmouth Rebellion in 1685, but was soon released, and in March 1688 he was granted a general pardon by James II.

Rowe was a supporter of the Glorious Revolution of 1688 and in 1689 he was appointed to superintend the collection of taxes in western England. The same year, he was elected as a Member of Parliament for Penryn, appointed Clerk of the Green Cloth in the household of William III, and made a justice of the peace for Middlesex. During the Convention Parliament, he compiled and published a blacklist of those MPs who had voted that James II had not left the throne vacant during the Revolution, with the aim of influencing the subsequent election. In 1690, Rowe was returned for Mitchell. He then represented Stockbridge from November to December 1693, before sitting again for Mitchell from January 1701 to March 1701.

References 

1640s births
Year of birth unknown
1704 deaths
Members of the pre-1707 English Parliament for constituencies in Cornwall
English justices of the peace
English MPs 1689–1690
English MPs 1690–1695
English MPs 1701
Whig members of the pre-1707 English Parliament